Frank Fessenden Dole (December 25, 1859 – May 22, 1939) was an American college football coach, dog breeder, and journalist. He was the first head football coach at the University of Pennsylvania, serving from 1885 to 1887, and leading the Penn Quakers to a record of 23–20–1 in three seasons.

Dole was born on December 25, 1859, in Portland, Maine. As a dog breeder, he specialized in Bull Terriers. Dole joined the New York Herald Tribune in 1912 as a writer, and remained on the newspaper's staff until 1938, when he retired as kennel editor. He died on May 22, 1939, at his home in Metuchen, New Jersey.

Head coaching record

References

External links
 

1859 births
1939 deaths
Dog breeders
New York Herald Tribune people
Penn Quakers football coaches
Sportspeople from Portland, Maine
Sportswriters from New York (state)
Coaches of American football from Maine